Little Union is an unincorporated community in Marion County, in the U.S. state of Missouri.

History
A post office Little Union was established in 1876, and remained in operation until 1886. The community took its name from a nearby church of the same name.

References

Unincorporated communities in Marion County, Missouri
Unincorporated communities in Missouri